Pantelimon Erhan (1884 – April/May 1971) was a Bessarabian politician and prime minister of the Moldavian Democratic Republic (1917–1918).

Biography
Pantelimon Erhan was born in 1884 in Tănătari, Căușeni District. He died in April or May 1971 in Bucharest.

Prime minister
He was the first prime minister of the Moldavian Democratic Republic ( - ).

On , Sfatul Țării elected the Pantelimon Erhan Cabinet (named the Council of Directors General), with nine members and with Pantelimon Erhan as President of the Council of Directors General and Director General for Agriculture. Agrarian reform was a cornerstone priority of the Moldavian Democratic Republic government.

The presence of the Romanian army in the Moldavian Democratic Republic caused tension within the council, with some of its members, including Pantelimon Erhan, protesting against it. In particular, they feared that the Romanian government, dominated by large land owners, could use the troops to prevent the envisaged agrarian reform.

See also
 Pantelimon Erhan Cabinet

References

 

1884 births
1971 deaths
People from Căușeni District
People from Bendersky Uyezd
Romanian people of Moldovan descent
Socialist Revolutionary Party politicians
Prime Ministers of Moldova
Moldovan MPs 1917–1918
Moldovan Ministers of Agriculture
People of the Russian Revolution